T Cross Ranch is a dude ranch in Fremont County, Wyoming. Apart from a cabin built by the site's original homesteader, the contributing buildings of the ranch date between 1916 and 1946. The ranch was established in 1918 by German immigrant Henry Seipt when he established his homestead and called it The Hermitage. Seipt and his family ran the ranch as a hunting and fishing camp until 1929, when it was sold to Robert and Helen Cox. The Coxes renamed it the T Cross Ranch and made it into a dude ranch. The new name was derived from the Tau Chapter of Saint Anthony's Society, to which Robert Cox had belonged at the Massachusetts Institute of Technology, and from the cross of St. Anthony. A total of 16 log buildings comprise the historic section of the ranch. The district also includes irrigation ditches dug during the 1920s and 1930s.

The T Cross Ranch was placed on the National Register of Historic Places in 2008.

References

External links
 T Cross Ranch Rural Historic District at the Wyoming State Historic Preservation Office
 T Cross Ranch at wyohistory.org

		
National Register of Historic Places in Fremont County, Wyoming
Buildings and structures completed in 1918
Dude ranches in Wyoming
Ranches on the National Register of Historic Places in Wyoming
Historic districts on the National Register of Historic Places in Wyoming